C Cat Trance were a post-punk band from Nottingham, England, formed by John Rees Lewis after his departure from Medium Medium. They released five albums before splitting up in the mid-1990s.

History
After leaving Medium Medium, Rees Lewis formed C Cat Trance with original Medium Medium drummer Nigel Kingston Stone. While similar in some respects to Medium Medium, They incorporated World music elements, releasing a self-titled debut mini-LP in 1983 on the Red Flame label. Subsequent releases were on the Red Flame sub-label Ink, starting with the "Dreams of Leaving" 12-inch single. They released one album a year between 1985 and 1987 and another in 1992 before splitting up.

John Rees Lewis later returned to a reformed Medium Medium.

Cherry Red released a collection of the band's best material in 2005.

Discography

Albums
C Cat Trance (1983), Red Flame 
Khamu (She Sleep Walks) (1985), Ink 6
Zouave (1986), Ink
Play Masenko Combo (1987), Ink
Les Invisibles (1992), Ink

Compilations
Karadara: The Cream of C Cat Trance (2005), Cherry Red

Singles
"Dreams of Living/(You've Got Me) Dangling on a String" (1984), Ink
"She Steals Cars" (1985), Ink
"Shake the Mind" (1986), Ink
"Screaming (To Be With You)" (1986), Ink
"Ishta Bil Habul (Cream Galore!)" (1987), Ink
"Yinniya" (1988), Ink
"Hobb" (1993), t:me

References

English post-punk music groups